Clethrogyna antiquoides is a moth of the family Erebidae. It is found in most of Europe, the Ural, Armenia, Mongolia, and China. This species has commonly been placed in the genus Orgyia but molecular analyses support the genus Clethrogyna as a separate lineage.

The wingspan is 20–24 mm for males. The females are wingless. Adult males are on wing from July to early September in one generation in Western Europe.

The larvae feed on Rubus chamaemorus, Sorbus aucuparia, Calluna vulgaris, Vaccinium uliginosum, Andromeda polifolia, and Empetrum nigrum. Larvae can be found from May to July. Pupation takes place in a conspicuous yellow cocoon. The females live in the cocoon and deposit the eggs there. The species hibernates as an egg.

References

External links
Species info
Lepidoptera of Belgium

Lymantriinae
Moths of Europe
Moths described in 1822